David Spence Thomson  (14 November 1915 – 25 October 1999) was a New Zealand politician of the National Party.

Biography
Thomson was born in Stratford, the son of former Stratford mayor Percy Thomson. He was a dairy farmer.

He served in the Army in the Middle East in World War II and was a Prisoner of War in 1942. He was awarded the Military Cross (MC) later in 1942. He married June Grace Adams in April 1942. They had one son and three daughters.

In the post-war years he was chairman of Federated Farmers. In 1953, he was awarded the Queen Elizabeth II Coronation Medal.

Parliamentary career 

He was returned for that electorate in every election until 1978, when it was disestablished. He served two terms as the Member of Parliament for Taranaki (the replacement seat) from 1978 to 1984, when he retired.

When Thomson entered Parliament, Keith Holyoake's government was in its second term. Thomson was appointed a minister in the government's third term, after the 1966 election. He initially held the roles of Minister of Defence, Minister in charge of Publicity, War Pensions and Rehabilitation, and Minister Assistant to the Prime Minister. Later he was also Minister of Tourism. For the government's fourth and final term, from 1969 to 1972, Thomson was Minister of Police and latterly in 1972 was Minister of Immigration.

Thomson won re-election in 1972 but National was unable to form a government. He served as National's Labour and Immigration spokesperson under Jack Marshall, and as Justice, Police and Immigration spokesperson under Robert Muldoon.

National formed a new government in 1975. Thomson was Minister of Justice from 1975 to 1978 and Minister of Defence and Leader of the House from 1978 to 1984, when he retired.

In the 1993 New Year Honours, Thomson was appointed a Companion of the Order of St Michael and St George, for public services.

Footnotes

References

Stratford District Centenary, R Habershon, (1978, Stratford District Council Centennial Committee)

External links
National Library of NZ, Cartoon
National Library of NZ, Image of Cabinet Ministers, 1966
National Library of NZ, Image of opening of Ministerial Council, 1968

|-

|-

|-

1915 births
1999 deaths
Members of the Cabinet of New Zealand
New Zealand defence ministers
New Zealand farmers
New Zealand National Party MPs
New Zealand prisoners of war in World War II
New Zealand military personnel of World War II
World War II prisoners of war held by Germany
New Zealand Army officers
People from Stratford, New Zealand
New Zealand Companions of the Order of St Michael and St George
New Zealand MPs for North Island electorates
New Zealand recipients of the Military Cross
New Zealand members of the Privy Council of the United Kingdom
Members of the New Zealand House of Representatives
20th-century New Zealand politicians
Justice ministers of New Zealand